The Thailand Fed Cup team represents Thailand in Fed Cup tennis competition and are governed by the Lawn Tennis Association of Thailand.  They currently compete in the Asia/Oceania Zone of Group I.

History
Thailand competed in its first Fed Cup in 1976.  Their best result was reaching World Group II in 2005 and 2006.

Current team (2017)
 Luksika Kumkhum
 Peangtarn Plipuech
 Nicha Lertpitaksinchai
 Kamonwan Buayam

See also
Fed Cup
Thailand Davis Cup team

External links

Billie Jean King Cup teams
Fed Cup
Fed Cup
1976 establishments in Thailand